The Avrig is a left tributary of the river Olt in Romania. It discharges into the Olt in the town Avrig. The upper reach of the river is also known as Râul Mare. Its source is the Avrig Lake in the Făgăraș Mountains.

There is a dam on the Avrig river for the water supply of the town Avrig and the village of Mârșa. The main bridges over the river are the Podul Jibrii and Podul lui Moise.

Tributaries

The following rivers are tributaries to the river Avrig:

Left: Racovița, Pârâul Adânc, Pârâul Șindrilei, Jibrea
Right: Auriștea, Pârâul Stâncos, Comănesei

References

Rivers of Romania
Rivers of Sibiu County